"Goodbye's All We've Got Left" is a song written and recorded by American singer-songwriter Steve Earle. It was released in January 1987 as the fourth single from his 1986 album Guitar Town. The song reached number 8 on the Billboard Hot Country Singles & Tracks chart.

Chart performance

References

1986 songs
1987 singles
Steve Earle songs
Songs written by Steve Earle
Song recordings produced by Tony Brown (record producer)
Song recordings produced by Emory Gordy Jr.
MCA Nashville Records singles